Albert Rubens (1614–1657), was the eldest son of Peter Paul Rubens and Isabella Brant. His research as a philologist and scholar of antiquity gained him the recognition of fellow scholars throughout Europe. He held an official position in the government of the Habsburg Netherlands as a secretary of the Privy Council of the Habsburg Netherlands.

Life
Albert Rubens was baptised on 5 June 1614, presumably within a few days of being born. The governor of the Spanish Netherlands, Albert VII, acted as godfather by proxy. He studied at the Latin school of the Augustinians in Antwerp, which ensured that he obtained a thorough schooling in classical literature from an early age. He was also tutored by Gaspar Gevartius, a scholar of repute who was a friend of his father. Under Gevartius he studied the humanistic core subjects of philosophy, numismatics and the classics.

Albert had a particular interest in Roman Antiquity and in numismatics.  In 1627 he became the youngest poet of Antwerp.  One of his poems about antique coins was published in the second edition of Jacob de Bie's book on Duke Charles III de Croÿ's ancient coin collection published in 1627 with the title  for which his father had designed the frontispiece.  His father introduced him to famous scholars of his time such as the French archaeologist Nicolas-Claude Fabri de Peiresc. 

When Peter Paul Rubens was sent on a diplomatic mission to the English court in 1630, King Philip IV of Spain felt it was proper to first appoint him as a secretary of the Privy Council of the Habsburg Netherlands, one of the administrative organs of the government of the Habsburg Netherlands.  The King intended that this role would be passed on to Rubens' son Albert.  As a result, Albert Rubens was on 15 June 1630 appointed acting secretary of the Privy Council. Only upon the death of his father in 1640 did he succeed to the post in full.  The prospect of a future gainful employment as a government official allowed Albert to pursue his studies and write about diverse scholarly subjects.  He also undertook the obligatory trip to Italy and was in Venice in 1634.

On 3 January 1641 Albert married Clara del Monte, daughter of Raymond del Monte, the brother of Peter Paul Rubens' friend and travel companion Deodat del Monte, and Susanna Fourment, the elder sister of Albert's stepmother Helena Fourment.  The couple settled in Brussels and had four children: Albert, Isabella, Constantia and Clara.  Their son Albert died in September 1656 after he was bitten by a rabid dog. His parents never recovered from the loss. Albert died on 1 October 1657 and Clara on 25 November following. Both were buried in the Rubens family chapel in the St. James' Church in Antwerp.  Their three daughters were raised by Albert's cousin, Filips Rubens, a city clerk in Antwerp.

Work

At the time of his death, Albert left a number of writings, some of them in finished form, others unfinished. A collection of his essays on ancient clothing, coins and gems was posthumously edited by the German scholar Johann Georg Graevius and published in 1665 by Balthasar Moretus in Antwerp under the title De re vestiaria veterum, [...], et alia eiusdem opuscula posthuma. It contained 3 folded plates plus 9 engravings of which 7 were engraved after designs by Peter Paul Rubens. The engraver was Cornelis Galle the Younger. The book included essays by Albert Rubens on the Gemma Augustea and the Gemma Tiberiana. He relied for his interpretation of the Gemma Tiberiana on the correspondence between his father and de Peiresc. This book was still highly regarded far into the 18th century.

In 1694 Graevius edited and published Albert Rubens' , which describes the life of the Roman Emperor Theodosius the Great and his sons and provides textual sources. This book was deemed very important and was republished in a new edition in 1754 to a very positive review.

An inventory of his collection of gems and cameos was drawn up in duplicate by Jean-Jacques Chifflet. A copy is kept in the Bibliothèque municipale de Besançon).  His gems included cameos with depictions of respectively the goddess Luna and Saint Joseph and a stone with an Aqua Virgo.  His coin collection was not extensive and included silver and bronze pieces.

Publications
De re vestiaria veterum, etc., Antwerp, Officina Plantiniana, 1665.
Dissertatio de vita Fl. Mallii Tbeodori, Utrecht, Willem Broedelet, 1694.

See also
Rubens family

References

External links

1614 births
1657 deaths
al
Flemish nobility
Flemish numismatists